Dendrochilum ignisiflorum is a species of orchid endemic in Benguet province in the Philippines.

Dendrochilum ignisiflorum was described in 2020 with the help from researchers from the Philippine Taxonomic Initiative (PTI), The research was led by M.N.Tamayo, Pranada and Rene Alfred Anton Bustamante. Its flowers, which does not exceed  in size, are noted for its fiery color. It is proposed to be classified as a vulnerable species under the IUCN Red List.

References 

ignisiflorum
Orchids of the Philippines
Flora of Luzon
Taxa named by Rene Alfred Anton Bustamante